Kengne Ludovick Takam (born June 21, 1983) is a Cameroonian professional footballer.

Career
Ludovick played for Balestier Khalsa during 2005–2007 season before joining Home United in 2008.

He helped Balestier Khalsa to be the team with biggest improvement in 2005 which bring them to 7th place out of 11 and also shock the fans with a victory over Tampines Rovers with a scoreline of 2–1 with both goals scored by him.

With a good pair up with Osagie Ederaro, he managed to score 44 league goals in 2 seasons at Balestier Khalsa and he scored 23 goals in his debut season with Home United in 2008.

He was the top goalscorer in the 2010 Thai Premier League campaign by scoring 17 goals for Pattaya United F.C.

Honours

Individual
 S.League Young Player of the Year: 2006
 S.League People Choice Award: 2008
 S.League 100 Goal: 2009
 Thai Premier League Player of the Month: July 2010
 Thai Premier League Golden Boot: 2010

References

External links
 Profile at Goal

1983 births
Living people
Footballers from Yaoundé
Cameroonian footballers
Association football forwards
Balestier Khalsa FC players
Home United FC players
Ludovick Takam
Ludovick Takam
Ludovick Takam
Ludovick Takam
Ludovick Takam
Ludovick Takam
Cameroonian expatriate footballers
Singapore Premier League players
Cameroonian expatriate sportspeople in Singapore
Expatriate footballers in Singapore
Ludovick Takam
Ludovick Takam
Cameroonian expatriate sportspeople in Thailand
Expatriate footballers in Thailand